Leporidae is the family of rabbits and hares, containing over 60 species of extant mammals in all. The Latin word Leporidae means "those that resemble lepus" (hare). Together with the pikas, the Leporidae constitute the mammalian order Lagomorpha. Leporidae differ from pikas in that they have short, furry tails and elongated ears and hind legs.

The common name "rabbit" usually applies to all genera in the family except Lepus, while members of Lepus (almost half the species) usually are called hares. Like most common names, however, the distinction does not match current taxonomy completely; jackrabbits are members of Lepus, and members of the genera Pronolagus and Caprolagus sometimes are called hares.

Various countries across all continents except Antarctica and Australia have indigenous species of Leporidae. Furthermore, rabbits, most significantly the European rabbit, Oryctolagus cuniculus, also have been introduced to most of Oceania and to many other islands, where they pose serious ecological and commercial threats.

Characteristics
Leporids are small to moderately sized mammals, adapted for rapid movement. They have long hind legs, with four toes on each foot, and shorter fore legs, with five toes each. The soles of their feet are hairy, to improve grip while running, and they have strong claws on all of their toes. Leporids also have distinctive, elongated and mobile ears, and they have an excellent sense of hearing. Their eyes are large, and their night vision is good, reflecting their primarily nocturnal or crepuscular mode of living.

Leporids are all roughly the same shape and fall within a small range of sizes with short tails, ranging from the 21 cm (8 in) long Tres Marias cottontail to the 76 cm (30 in) long desert hare. Female leporids are almost always larger than males, which is unusual among terrestrial mammals, in which males are usually the larger sex.

Both rabbits and hares are almost exclusively herbivorous (although some Lepus species are known to eat carrion), feeding primarily on grasses and herbs, although they also eat leaves, fruit, and seeds of various kinds. They are coprophagous, as they pass food through their digestive systems twice, first expelling it as soft green feces, called cecotropes, which they then reingest, eventually producing hard, dark fecal pellets. Like rodents, they have powerful front incisor teeth, but they also have a smaller second pair of incisors to either side of the main teeth in the upper jaw, and the structure is different from that of rodent incisors. Also like rodents, leporids lack any canine teeth, but they do have more cheek teeth than rodents do. Their jaws also contain a large diastema. The dental formula of most, though not all, leporids is: 

They have adapted to a remarkable range of habitats, from desert to tundra, forests, mountains, and swampland. Rabbits generally dig permanent burrows for shelter, the exact form of which varies between species. In contrast, hares rarely dig shelters of any kind, and their bodies are more suited to fast running than to burrowing.

The gestation period in leporids varies from around 28 to 50 days, and is generally longer in the hares. This is in part because young hares, or leverets, are born fully developed, with fur and open eyes, while rabbit kits are naked and blind at birth, having the security of the burrow to protect them. Leporids can have several litters a year, which can cause their population to expand dramatically in a short time when resources are plentiful.

Reproduction 
Leporids are typically polygynandrous, and have highly developed social systems. Their social hierarchies determine which males mate when the females go into estrus, which happens throughout the year. Gestation periods are variable, but in general, higher latitudes correspond to shorter gestation periods. Moreover, the gestation time and litter size correspond to predation rates as well. Species nesting below ground tend to have lower predation rates and have larger litters.

Evolution

The oldest known leporid species date from the late Eocene, by which time the family was already present in both North America and Asia. Over the course of their evolution, this group has become increasingly adapted to lives of fast running and leaping. For example, Palaeolagus, an extinct rabbit from the Oligocene of North America, had shorter hind legs than modern forms (indicating it ran rather than hopped) though it was in most other respects quite rabbit-like. Two as yet unnamed fossil finds—dated ~48 Ma (from China) and ~53 Ma (India)—while primitive, display the characteristic leporid ankle, thus pushing the divergence of Ochotonidae and Leporidae yet further into the past.

The cladogram is from Matthee et al., 2004, based on nuclear and mitochondrial gene analysis.

Classification

Family Leporidae: rabbits and hares
 Genus Pentalagus
 Amami rabbit, Pentalagus furnessi
 Genus Bunolagus
 Riverine rabbit, Bunolagus monticularis
 Genus Nesolagus
 Sumatran striped rabbit, Nesolagus netscheri
 Annamite striped rabbit, Nesolagus timminsi
 Genus Romerolagus
 Volcano rabbit, Romerolagus diazi
 Genus Brachylagus
 Pygmy rabbit, Brachylagus idahoensis
 Genus Sylvilagus
 Subgenus Tapeti
 Swamp rabbit, Sylvilagus aquaticus
Andean tapetí, Sylvilagus andinus
Bogota tapetí, Sylvilagus apollinaris
Ecuadorian tapetí, Sylvilagus daulensis
 Common tapetí, Sylvilagus brasiliensis
Fulvous tapetí, Sylvilagus fulvescens
 Dice's cottontail, Sylvilagus dicei
Central American tapetí, Sylvilagus gabbi
Northern tapetí, Sylvilagus incitatus
 Omilteme cottontail, Sylvilagus insonus
Nicefor's tapetí, Sylvilagus nicefori
Marsh rabbit, Sylvilagus palustris
Suriname tapetí, Sylvilagus parentum
Colombian tapetí, Sylvilagus salentus
Santa Marta tapetí, Sylvilagus sanctaemartae
Western tapetí, Sylvilagus surdaster
Coastal tapetí, Sylvilagus tapetillus
Venezuelan lowland rabbit, Sylvilagus varynaensis
 Subgenus Sylvilagus
 Desert cottontail, Sylvilagus audubonii
 Mexican cottontail, Sylvilagus cunicularis
 Eastern cottontail, Sylvilagus floridanus
 Tres Marias cottontail, Sylvilagus graysoni
Robust cottontail, Sylvilagus holzneri
 Mountain cottontail, Sylvilagus nuttallii
 Appalachian cottontail, Sylvilagus obscurus
 New England cottontail, Sylvilagus transitionalis
 Subgenus Microlagus
 Brush rabbit, Sylvilagus bachmani
 Genus Oryctolagus
 European rabbit, Oryctolagus cuniculus
 Genus Poelagus
 Bunyoro rabbit, Poelagus marjorita
 Genus Pronolagus
 Natal red rock hare, Pronolagus crassicaudatus
 Jameson's red rock hare, Pronolagus randensis
 Smith's red rock hare, Pronolagus rupestris
 Hewitt's red rock hare, Pronolagus saundersiae
 Genus Caprolagus
 Hispid hare, Caprolagus hispidus
 Genus Lepus
 Subgenus Macrotolagus
 Antelope jackrabbit, Lepus alleni
 Subgenus Poecilolagus
 Snowshoe hare, Lepus americanus
 Subgenus Lepus
 Arctic hare, Lepus arcticus
 Alaskan hare, Lepus othus
 Mountain hare, Lepus timidus
 Subgenus Proeulagus
 Black jackrabbit, Lepus insularis
 Desert hare, Lepus tibetanus
 Tolai hare, Lepus tolai
 Subgenus Eulagos
 Broom hare, Lepus castroviejoi
 Yunnan hare, Lepus comus
 Korean hare, Lepus coreanus
 European hare, Lepus europaeus
 Manchurian hare, Lepus mandshuricus
 Ethiopian highland hare, Lepus starcki
 Subgenus Sabanalagus
 Ethiopian hare, Lepus fagani
 African savanna hare, Lepus victoriae
 Subgenus Indolagus
 Hainan hare, Lepus hainanus
 Indian hare, Lepus nigricollis
 Burmese hare, Lepus peguensis
 Subgenus Sinolagus
Chinese hare, Lepus sinensis
 Subgenus Tarimolagus
 Yarkand hare, Lepus yarkandensis
 Incertae sedis
 Tamaulipas jackrabbit, Lepus altamirae
 Japanese hare, Lepus brachyurus
Black-tailed jackrabbit, Lepus californicus
 White-sided jackrabbit, Lepus callotis
 Cape hare, Lepus capensis
 Corsican hare, Lepus corsicanus
 Tehuantepec jackrabbit, Lepus flavigularis
 Granada hare, Lepus granatensis
 Abyssinian hare, Lepus habessinicus
 Woolly hare, Lepus oiostolus
 Scrub hare, Lepus saxatilis
 White-tailed jackrabbit, Lepus townsendii
Genus †Serengetilagus
 †Serengetilagus praecapensis
Genus †Aztlanolagus
 †Aztlanolagus agilis

Predation
Predators of rabbits and hares include raccoons, snakes, eagles, canids, cats, mustelids, owls and hawks. Animals that eat roadkill rabbits include vultures and buzzards.

See also

 Mara (mammal)
 Viscacha

References

Leporidae
Mammal families
Extant Ypresian first appearances
Taxa named by Gotthelf Fischer von Waldheim